Jill Bauman is an American artist.  She has been nominated for the World Fantasy Award five times and nominated for the Chesley Award several times. Her art has been exhibited at the Delaware Art Museum, the Moore College of Art, Art Students League of New York, the NY Illustrators Society & and the Science Fiction Museum of Seattle.  Jill Bauman has created hundreds of book covers for horror, mystery, fantasy, science fiction, and best selling books including 23 of the Cat Who… books by Lilian Jackson Braun during the 1980s and 1990s.

Jill Bauman got her Bachelor of Arts from Adelphi University. She did her Graduate work at Adelphi University and Queens College. She is a Life Member of the Art Students League of New York.

She was born in Brooklyn, New York, and she lives in Queens, New York and has two grown daughters.

Authors and magazines
Jill Bauman has illustrated the written works of many authors of horror, mystery, fantasy, science fiction, and speculative fiction.  Including: J. G. Ballard, Clive Barker, Gregory Benford, Lilian Jackson Braun, David Brin, Orson Scott Card, John Crowley, Jack Dann, Harlan Ellison, Paul Di Filippo, Ray Garton,  Jonathan Gash, Brian Keene, Stephen King, Dean Koontz,  Nancy Kress, Katherine Kurtz, Richard Laymon, Fritz Leiber, H. P. Lovecraft, Anne McCaffrey, Robert R. McCammon, Mike Resnick, Pamela Sargent, Dan Simmons, Peter Straub, Michael Swanwick, Chet Williamson, Jack Williamson, Gene Wolfe,  and more

She has done artwork for many magazines. Including:
Amazing Stories
Cemetery Dance Magazine
Fantasy & Science Fiction Magazine (she is included in their top 10 most used cover illustrators)
Flesh & Blood Magazine
Future Magazine
Horror Express
Inhuman Magazine
Space & Time Magazine
Starlog Magazine
Weird Tales

Notable works

Covers
A Quiet Night of Fear by Charles L. Grant (Berkley Books, 1980)
Other Stories and... The Attack of the Giant Baby by Kit Reed (Berkley Books, 1981)
A Glow of Candles by Charles L. Grant (Berkley Books, 1981)
Carlisle Street by T. M. Wright (Tor Books, 1982).
The Practice Effect by David Brin (Doubleday Book Club, 1984)
The Doll Who Ate His Mother by Ramsey Campbell (Tor Books, 1984)
Melancholy Elephants by Spider Robinson (Tor Books, 1984)
Cat Who… series of books by Lilian Jackson Braun. 23 covers from 1985–1996
Song of Kali by Dan Simmons  (Hardcover/Bluejay Books, Paperback/Tor Books, 1985)
A Stainless Steel Rat is Born by Harry Harrison  (Doubleday SF Book Club, 1985)
Nightshow by Richard Laymon  (Tor Books, 1985)
The Judas Rose by Suzette Haden Elgin (DAW Books, 1986)
The Long Night of the Grave by Charles L. Grant (Don Grant Books)
The Lost Heir (Sherlock Holmes Solo Mystery number 8) by Gerald Lientz  (Iron Crown Publishing, 1988)
Mort by Terry Pratchett (Doubleday Book Club, 1989).
The Jewel in the Skull by Michael Moorcock (Ace Books, 1989)
The Magic Wagon by Joe R. Lansdale (Borderlands Press, 1990).
Edgeworks I by Harlan Ellison (White Wolf, 1995)
Slippage by Harlan Ellison (Mark V. Zeising Books, 1997)
The Confidential Casebook of Sherlock Holmes by Marvin Kaye (St. Martin’s Press, 1997)
Parallelities by Alan Dean Foster (Doubleday SF Book Club, 1998).
The View from Hell by John Shirley (Subterranean Press, 2000)
Bottled in Blonde by Hugh B. Cave (Fedogan & Bremer, 2000)
The Infernal Device and Others by Michael Kurland (St. Martin’s Press, 2001)
Serpent Girl by Ray Garton (Cemetery Dance Publications, 2006)
Mad Dogs' by Brian Hodge (Cemetery Dance Publications, 2007)The Story of Noichi the Blind by Chet Williamson (Cemetery Dance Publications, 2007)Kill Whitey by Brian Keene (Cemetery Dance Publications, 2008)Poe by Stewart O'Nan (Lonely Road Books, 2008)

Frontispieces and interior illustrationsDeathbird Stories by Harlan Ellison (Easton Press, 1989) - Frontispiece and five color interiorsMaps in a Mirror by Orson Scott Card (Easton Press, 1990) - Frontispiece and one interiorThe Dead Zone by Stephen King (Easton Press, 1992) - Frontispiece and two color interiorsThe Dunwich Horror by H.P. Lovecraft (Easton Press, 1993) -  Frontispiece and two interiorsThe Chronicles of Pern: First Fall by Anne McCaffrey (Easton Press, 1994) - FrontispieceGather, Darkness by Fritz Leiber (Easton Press, 1996) - FrontispieceGormenghast Trilogy by Mervyn Peake (Easton Press, 1997) - FrontispieceDark Forces: The 25th Anniversary Edition edited by Kirby McCauley (Lonely Road Books, 2007) - Jill Bauman illustrated "The Bingo Master" by Joyce Carol Oates, "The Garden of Blackred Roses" by Charles L. Grant and "Children of the Kingdom" by T.E.D. KleinA Lovecraft Retrospective: Artists Inspired by H.P Lovercraft from Centipede Press, 2008 - Includes two illustrations by Jill BaumanThe Passage by Justin Cronin (Cemetery Dance Publications, 2010) - Interior greyscale illustrations

Trading cards and collectible card gamesFantasy Adventures by Mayfair GamesCthulhu Mythos by Fantasy Flight Games

Poetry and short stories

Poems
"Bedtime," from Silver Web magazine (Fall/Winter, 1993)
"The Wanderer," from Worlds of Fantasy and Horror magazine #3 (Summer, 1996)
"Black Ghost," from Weird Tales magazine #318 (Winter, 1999)
"Inhuman," from Inhuman magazine #2
"Nightlife," from Flesh & Blood magazine #11 (2003)
"The Storm," from Space & Time magazine #97 (2003)
"Dark," "Weaver of Dreams," and "The Empty House" from The Horror Express magazine #3 (Winter, 2004)
"Oracle," from Weird Tales magazine, Volume 60, #4 (December, 2004)

Short story
"Mousenight", a short story (written with Alan M. Clark) from Bedtime Stories to Darken Your Dreams edited by Bruce Holland Rogers.

Guest of Honor appearances
Artist Guest of Honor at the 1982 at Necon, Bristol, RI (program book included an interview with Jill Bauman)
Artist Guest of Honor at the 1992 at the World Fantasy Convention (program book included an interview with Jill Bauman)
Artist Guest of Honor at the 1990 I-Con, Stony Brook University, NY (program book included an interview with Jill Bauman)
Artist Guest of Honor at the 1996 Albacon, Albany, NY (program book included an interview with Jill Bauman)
Artist Guest of Honor at the 1999 Philcon, Philadelphia, PA (program book included an interview with Jill Bauman)
Artist Guest of Honor at the 2001 Chattacon, Chattanooga, TN (program book included an interview with Jill Bauman)

ReferencesStarlog magazine, 1983, "Interview with Jill Bauman"Silver Web magazine, 1993, "Jill Bauman—Queen of Darkness" (interview by Stanley Wiater)Fangoria'' magazine #78 (October, 1988), "Interview with Jill Bauman"
"Jill Bauman—An Appreciation" by F. Paul Wilson for I-CON IX program book (1990)

External links
Jill Bauman's official site
Jill Bauman's biography on her official site
Jill Bauman section on Horror-web.com

American women illustrators
American illustrators
Writers from New York (state)
American women short story writers
Living people
American speculative fiction artists
Horror artists
Fantasy artists
Science fiction artists
American women poets
20th-century American poets
21st-century American poets
20th-century American women writers
21st-century American women writers
Artists from Brooklyn
20th-century American short story writers
21st-century American short story writers
Year of birth missing (living people)